This is a list of the Mayors of the City of Ballarat, a local government area and the third largest city in Victoria, Australia.

Ballarat Mayors (1863–1921)

Ballarat East Mayors (1863–1921)

Amalgamated Municipality: City of Ballarat

Commissioners (1994–1995)

City of Ballarat Mayors since 1995

Ballarat
Mayors Ballarat